The 1977 NCAA Division II Lacrosse Championship was the fourth annual single-elimination tournament to determine the national champions of NCAA Division II and Division III men's college lacrosse in the United States.

A separate Division III men's championship would not be introduced until 1980.

This year's final was played at Boswell Field at the Hobart College in Geneva, New York. 

Defending champions Hobart defeated Washington College, 23−13, to win their second national title. This marked four consecutive championship game appearances for Hobart.

The undefeated Statesmen (15–0) were coached by Jerry Schmidt.

Bracket

See also
NCAA Division I Men's Lacrosse Championship
NCAA Division III Men's Lacrosse Championship (from 1980)
NCAA Division II Women's Lacrosse Championship (from 2001)

References

NCAA Division II Men's Lacrosse Championship
NCAA Division II Men's Lacrosse Championship
NCAA Division I Men's Lacrosse